Liam Michael Pickering (born 9 September 1968) is a former professional Australian rules footballer who played for the North Melbourne Football Club and the Geelong Football Club in the Australian Football League (AFL).

His father, Michael Pickering, also played for North Melbourne.

Sporting career
He played 22 games with North Melbourne from 1989–1992, and 102 games with Geelong from 1993–1999, before his retirement from AFL football. Pickering won the club best & fairest award in 1997.

He was also a talented cricketer who played 171 matches for North Melbourne Cricket Club in the Victorian Premier Cricket competition.

Media and managing careers
He is a well known player agent. 
He currently co-hosts a Saturday-morning radio show with Craig Hutchison called "Off The Bench" on Melbourne station SEN 1116.

References

External links
 
 

1968 births
North Melbourne Football Club players
Geelong Football Club players
Carji Greeves Medal winners
Australian rules footballers from Victoria (Australia)
Stawell Football Club players
Living people
Victorian State of Origin players